Can Stock Photo is a stock photography provider which licenses royalty-free images, photos, digital illustrations, picture clip art and footage files on behalf of photographers, illustrators, and videographers. Founded in 2004, it was one of the earliest microstock agencies.

Purchasing and use
Can Stock Photo provides 21 million images to customers, provided by 40,000 photographers and artists worldwide. The site supports both subscription and credit licensing models. Can Stock Photo is one of the few agencies in its industry to allows users to license images individually without a membership.

Licensed images have been notably used by industry blogs such as TechCrunch, social media sites such as BuzzFeed, feature films such as Whiplash, news agencies such as CBS 5, and various YouTube videos, websites, and books.

Contributors
Contributing photographers must apply before they are eligible to upload their images. The applicants must submit three images that are screened for quality and suitability. Once approved, photographers can begin uploading their work through the website. They supply keywords, categorize the images, and submit them for review, where each image is examined to ensure that it meets the standards of quality, usefulness and copyright laws. A model and property release is required when applicable. Contributors earn royalties each time their files are licensed.

Can Stock Photo receives 25,000 contributor submissions per day.

See also 
Stock photography
Microstock photography

References

External links

Stock photography
Photo agencies